Bethel is a census-designated place (CDP) in Kitsap County, Washington, United States. Located a few miles south of the city of Port Orchard, Bethel is a wooded residential area. Most residents commute to Port Orchard or nearby cities. It was first designated a place by the Census Bureau in the 2010 Census, at which time its population was 3,713.

Geography
Bethel is in southern Kitsap County and is bordered to the northwest by Port Orchard, to the north by unincorporated East Port Orchard, and to the northeast by unincorporated Parkwood. Washington State Route 16 forms the western edge of the Bethel CDP; the highway runs northwest  to Gorst and south  to Tacoma. State Route 160 forms the northern edge of the Bethel CDP and leads east  to Southworth.

References

Census-designated places in Washington (state)
Census-designated places in Kitsap County, Washington